Jean Augustin Ernouf (Manuel Louis Jean Augustin or Auguste Ernouf) (29 August 1753 – 12 September 1827) was a French general and colonial administrator of the Revolutionary and Napoleonic wars. He demonstrated moderate abilities as a combat commander; his real strength lay in his organizational and logistical talents.  He held several posts as chief-of-staff and in military administration.

He joined the military in 1791, as a private in the French Revolutionary Army; from September 1791 to September 1793, he was promoted from lieutenant to brigadier general. He and his commanding officer were accused of being counter-revolutionaries, disgraced, and then, in 1794, restored to  rank. In 1804, Napoleon I appointed him as governor general of the French colony in Saint-Domingue and Guadeloupe, following the suppression of a widespread slave insurrection. Although he was able to reestablish some semblance of order and agricultural production, the British overwhelmed the colony in 1810 and, after a brief engagement, forced him to capitulate.

He returned to France on a prisoner exchange, but was charged with treason by Napoleon I, enraged by the loss of the colony to the British.  Before he could be exonerated by a court, the First Empire fell; with the Bourbon Restoration, he retained his honors, and received command of the III Corps, in Marseille.  After the second restoration, he held an administrative position in one of the occupation zones, and later he was elected to the Chamber of Deputies of France.

Military career

After completing school, Ernouf received entered military service as a private in the Revolutionary army. He was commissioned as a lieutenant of infantry in the 1st Battalion of Volunteers of the Orne on the 24 September 1791, and as a captain on 22 March 1792, and 5 May 1793 he became an aide-de-camp of General Barthel's Army of the North.  On 30 July 1793, he was promoted to the rank of lieutenant colonel.

Initial successes in the Lowlands and the lower Rhine
In 1793, during the War of the First Coalition, Ernouf was sent to Cassel to strengthen the French position. The Duke of York laid siege to Dunkirk and blockaded the town of Bergues, on the Belgian border, which had insufficient garrison to fend off the British. Ernouf assembled a force of a thousand men and joined Jean Nicolas Houchard; together they marched to the relief of Dunkirk. Once there, he led a column in attack on the British camp. On 5 complémentaire an I (21 September 1793), which would have been the last day of the first year of the new Republic, he was raised to the rank of brigadier general and was appointed on 9 vendémiaire an II (30 September 1793) as chief of staff to the Army of the North.

It was also by his advice that the commander-in-chief, Jean-Baptiste Jourdan, discovered Josias, Prince of Coburg's unfortunate position behind the Wattignies forest, compelled him to retreat across the Sambre and subsequently lifted the siege of Maubeuge: Ernouf's part in this action, the Battle of Hondschoote, earned him his promotion to major general on 23 frimaire an II (13 December 1793).  When Jourdan did not order an aggressive pursuit, both he and Ernouf were recalled by the Committee of Public Safety in disgrace.  He was suspended on suspicion of being a counter-revolutionary, but reinstated upon the end of the Reign of Terror in 1795.  Upon his reinstatement, he was appointed chief of staff of the Army of the Moselle and the Army of Sambre-et-Meuse. He held several administrative posts, including a stint in which he helped to develop the topographical and geographical military maps.

Action in Swabia and Switzerland

In 1798, Jourdan appointed him as chief of staff for the Army of Observation. Ernouf was with the Army of Observation when it crossed the Rhine river, in what British historians have called a violation of the Treaty of Campo Formio, resulting in the War of the Second Coalition.  On 2 March, the Army was renamed Army of the Danube, and it marched to Upper Swabia, where it engaged Archduke Charles' Habsburg force at Ostrach on 21 March, and again on 25 March at Stockach.  In both battles, the Habsburg manpower, superior to the French numbers by three to one and two to one respectively, overwhelmed the French lines; Jourdan, the commander of the Army, was unable to concentrate his forces sufficiently to counteract the Habsburg numbers, and withdrew to the Black Forest in late March.  Ernouf took command of the Army of the Danube while Jourdan returned to Paris to request more troops.  He was replaced as commander of the Army of the Danube by André Masséna, and served as Massena's chief of staff in the Swiss campaign of 1799, during which he saw action in Zurich and central Switzerland; he was again at Zurich for the French victory over Alexander Rimsky-Korsakov.

Caribbean appointment

In 1804, Ernouf became a Grand Officer of the Legion of Honor.  Shortly afterward, he was sent to Guadeloupe and Saint-Domingue as Captain General of the colony, to restore order in the wake of the slave and mulatto rebellion against slavery and the Saint-Domingue campaign of Charles Victor Emmanuel Leclerc.

Within a year, after burning former slaves who refused to go back to the plantations, Ernouf had restored slavery and agricultural production. From his base on Guadeloupe, he dealt generously with many of the refugee planters who escaped the previous years' carnage. He also took over the Swedish island of St. Barts, where the rebels of St. Domingo had taken refuge, and from which they coordinated privateering 80 million francs. There is some evidence to suggest that he either actively encouraged, or at least permitted, the earlier practice of privateering against British and American shipping; British officers later found open commissions, signed by Ernouf, which suggested he was granting commissions to pirates for "services" rendered. Four privateer ships sailing from Guadeloupe between 1805 and 1810 bore the name Général Ernouf, one of which was the captured sloop-of-war HMS Lilly), which underscores his encouragement of privateering. His task was further complicated by the failure of the Treaty of Amiens and the outbreak of war with Britain. To protect Guadeloupe, he established coastal batteries.

The British capture of Martinique in 1809 marked a critical point for the French on Guadeloupe; blockaded on all sides by the naval forces of the British, the French civilians and soldiers were reduced to near starvation. In January 1810, the British initiated an invasion of Guadeloupe; Sir Alexander Cochrane's naval force landed 11,000  British troops under the command of Lieutenant General George Beckwith landed at Capesterre, or the eastern side of the islands. Attacked on three sides at the end of January 1810, Ernouff's force mounted a spirited, although short defense and capitulated on 6 February 1810, after which he was transported to Britain. He was repatriated to France in a prisoner exchange in 1811. Irritated at the loss of Guadeloupe to the British, Napoleon accused him of abuse of power, embezzlement, and treason. Ernouf spent 23 months in captivity in France while the courts debated how to proceed.

Restoration

At the Bourbon Restoration, Louis XVIII suspended the proceedings against him for lack of evidence and Ernouf entered into Bourbon service. He was created Chevalier of Saint-Louis, on 20 August of that year, and he was appointed Inspector General of Infantry.  On 3 January 1815, he went in that capacity in Marseille.  In March 1815, he received a command in the 1st Corps, under the general command of  Charles, Duke of Angoulême.

Napoleon's return

Ernouf was on an inspection away from this command when Napoleon landed at Cannes. Upon his landing, many of the soldiers of Angoulême's army flocked to Bonaparte's banner, beginning the Hundred Days. The mere news of Napoleon's escape from Elba and the defection of some of the troops caused Charles, Duke of Angoulême, to panic and capitulate. Ernouf returned to Marseille, where he learned that André Masséna also had chosen the imperial cause, after which he left for Paris. Napoleon rescinded Ernouf's honors and titles, and dismissed him from his post in the military on 15 April 1815. After Napoleon's final defeat at the Battle of Waterloo, the second restoration of the Bourbons that summer also restored Ernouf's rights and property.

Later years

On 3 May 1816, Louis XVIII granted him the title of Baron with the Commander's Cross of the Order of Saint Louis, which entitled him to wear a red sash (right shoulder to left hip); he automatically received a pension, and hereditary nobility was granted to the son and grandson of knights. On 11 November 1816, Enrouf received command of the III Division, located at Metz, which was occupied by Allied troops as a condition of the Second Treaty of Paris; his role was to maintain harmony between residents and the foreign soldiers.

Elected by the Moselle, in 1816, he obtained in 1818 permission to sit in the Chamber of Deputies, and left the command of the III Division when he became eligible for retirement on 22 July 1822.   He died in Paris on 12 September 1827.

Family

Ernouf was married to Geneviève Miloent (d. 22 November 1822). Ernouf's son, Gaspard Augustin (8 December 1777 – 25 October 1848), was also a military commander during the French Revolutionary and Napoleonic Wars.  Gaspard and his wife, Adelaïde Guesdon, were the parents of the 19th century historian, Alfred Auguste Ernouf (1816–1889).

Sources

Citations and notes

References

 Adkins, Roy and Lesley. War for all the Oceans. New York. Penguin, 2008, 978-0143113928.
 Blanning, Timothy.  The French Revolutionary Wars. New York: Oxford University Press, 1996.  .
 Blaufarb, Rafe (ed.). "Pierre-Louis Roederer, Speech Proposing the Creation of a Legion of Honour". Napoleon: Symbol for an Age, A Brief History with Documents. New York: Bedford/St. Martin's, 2008.
 Dodge, Theodore Ayrault.  Napoleon: A History of the Art of War. vol. 3, Boston: Houghton Mifflin Co, 1904.
  Etat civil reconstitué 1798–1860: . Paris: ARFIDO S.A., 2006.
 Jourdan, Jean-Baptiste. A Memoir of the operations of the army of the Danube under the command of General Jourdan, taken from the manuscripts of that officer. London: Debrett, 1799.
 
 
 Phipps, Ramsey Weston. The Armies of the First French Republic, volume 5: The armies of the Rhine in Switzerland, Holland, Italy, Egypt and the coup d'état of Brumaire, 1797–1799. Oxford: Oxford University Press, 1939.
 Smith, Digby,  The Greenhill Napoleonic Wars Data Book: Actions and Losses in Personnel, Colours, Standards and Artillery, 1792–1815. Greenhill, Pennsylvania: Stackpole, 1998, .
 Warner, Charles Dudley (ed.). "Alfred Auguste Ernouf." Biographical Dictionary and Synopsis of Books Ancient and Modern. Akron, Ohio: Werner, 1902.

External links and sources

 

French generals
Governors of Saint-Domingue
1753 births
1827 deaths
French commanders of the Napoleonic Wars
Military leaders of the French Revolutionary Wars
People of the Haitian Revolution
Grand Officiers of the Légion d'honneur
Knights of the Order of Saint Louis
Military personnel from Alençon
1810s in Guadeloupe
19th-century French military personnel